Re Daniel Dawal Migel is a Sri Lankan film series centered on a series of comedy action films, produced by EAP Films and distributed by EAP cinema theaters.

Overview
The franchise consists of three films in the Re Daniel Dawal Migel series, Re Daniel Dawal Migel (1998), Re Daniel Dawal Migel 2 (2000) and Re Daniel Dawal Migel 3 (2004). All three films of the franchise was directed by Roy de Silva with his story, screenplay and dialogues. Cinematography of the first film by G. Nandasena and Lalith M. Gomez and edited by Densil Jayaweera and Pradeep Mahesh. The second film cinematography by G. Nandasena and edited by Densil Jayaweera. Third film cinematography done by G. Nandasena and Lalith M. Gomez and edited by Densil Jayaweera and Pradeep Mahesh.

History

Timeline

Films

Re Daniel Dawal Migel (1998)

Daniel and Migel are two kind-hearted, but thieves in the village. They were known to steal chickens, goats, cattle and also do canny things and they are caught by the village head master. With these incidents, they started to leave the village and move to town. After moving to town, two detectives Cobra and his allies looking for Daniel and Migel to arrest them. Meanwhile, Daniel and migel were caught by gangs through a woman Madhuri. After a fight, and Daniel and Migel become friends with Madhuri. The gang is led by Chandi Ayya and they came to seek Madhuri. Daniel and Migel rescues Madhuri and Chandi Ayya also left the gang and become friends. After many incidents, the four of them escape from two detectives several times and fall in love with higher noble families, indicating that the four are also very rich. Soon the lovers realized the fake and refused them. The final battle with Chandi ayya's former group is taken place and the four realized their lies. Daniel and Migel are arrested at the end credits.

Re Daniel Dawal Migel 2 (2000)

At the end of first film, Daniel and Migel was jailed for more than 1700 years. But they well enjoyed in their life in prison by dancing and singing songs with other prisoners. The two was released after two years in jail by president's excuse. Just after come out of the jail, the two are attacked by the tailor, who gave their suits prior to arrest. They ran naked after giving their suits and met by a newly wedded couple. They moved to a hotel and act like two Indian superstars and soon they were arrested by the police due to these nuisance for the public. At the police, the two see Chandi ayya and asked what happened to him and Madhuri after their imprisonment. Chandi ayya told the story that he went to commit suicide and rescued by Lathara's daughter Wasana. Madhuri went to see his mother-in-law with Sanjaya and not much known about her. The three released by the police and they started to find Madhuri. Chandi ayya welcomes his two friends to Uncle Lathara's house. Lathara is a musician who always plays harmonium. Meanwhile, Madhuri was caught by Richard, who is drug dealer and detective Cobra's allie investigate about her and tells the story to Chandi ayya and duo. The three went to see Madhuri and a fight taken place. Madhuri has been rescued and bring back to Sanjaya and explained about the past. The two united again and married finally

Re Daniel Dawal Migel 3 (2004)

Daniel and Migel started to looking for a new life and citing them as 007 and 008. The two started to help people by listening their problems. The two has a new friend Pin Pon who is the broker of all these problems. Silva and his friend settled in Lathara's house and Silva fall in love with Lathara's daughter. But Lathara does not like him and asked him to bring 2 lakhs and be a rich man and then he will decide to marry them. Meanwhile, Victor is looking for his wife Moreen's death to acquire her millions of properties and marry a new girl. Victor asked 007 and 008 to kill his wife and he'll pay for it. The two tried many ways to kill her but no one had ever success. Silva is also looking to kidnap rich Moreen and ask money from Victor. However, with the help of Daniel and Migel, Moreen has been kidnapped and explained her husband's secret life. Moreen was very disappointed and ask Daniel and Migel to punish him. Finally after series of incidents, Victor was captured by a fake death of Moreen, which was a drama to capture him and find money. Victor was jailed, Daniel and Migel got money, whereas Lathara accepted Silva as his son-in-law.

Cast and characters

Technical crew

Soundtracks

Re Daniel Dawal Migel

Re Daniel Dawal Migel 2

Re Daniel Dawal Migel 3

References

External links
 
 
 

Film series introduced in 1998
Comedy film series
Sri Lankan comedy films